Lobkovo is a rural locality (a village) in Markovskoye Rural Settlement, Vologodsky District, Vologda Oblast, Russia. The population was 22 as of 2002.

Geography 
Lobkovo is located 31 km southeast of Vologda (the district's administrative centre) by road. Nizma is the nearest rural locality.

References 

Rural localities in Vologodsky District